Primula hookeri (commonly known as Hooker's primrose) is a perennial species of primrose which is found at the altitudes of  in Eastern Himalayas as well as in Bhutan, Myanmar, Nepal, Northeast India and southeastern Tibet and northwestern Yunnan provinces of China.

Description
P. hookeri have an oblong and nearly erect lobes which are subtruncate and a little bit emarginated at the apex. Flowers homostylous. Flowers are of yellow color.

References

hookeri
Flora of Tibet
Flora of Yunnan
Flora of the Indian subcontinent
Flora of Myanmar